Kittie Doswell (April 14, 1939 – May 1, 2011) was an American R&B, soul and jazz vocalist from Houston, Texas, United States, who later in life began a public service career.

Music career
Doswell made a handful of notable, highly collectible records in the 1960s and 1970s, and was at one time working in both Los Angeles and New York. In New York she recorded twice for The Night Blooming Jazzmen in 1971 and 1972, and worked with Leonard Feather, Blue Mitchell, Ernie Watts, Fred Robinson, Chino Valdes, Paul Humphries, Max Bennett, and Al McKibbon.

Later career
From 1969 to 1974, Doswell was a communication operator with Los Angeles County.  From 1976 to 1985, she worked at Forest Lawn Memorial Park (Glendale) in Glendale, California as a licensed embalmer.

Doswell later began a career with the U.S. Food and Drug Administration in 1985, serving as a seafood inspector in FDA's Los Angeles District, San Pedro, California.  She served in that capacity until her death on May 1, 2011 due to lung cancer.  Known to coworkers as 'Ms. Kittie,' she proved extremely productive in what is normally a very labor-intensive activity even for younger workers.  Her greatest contribution within FDA, however, was as a trainer and mentor of new employees. In addition, she was active in the LGBT community, promoting awareness and participating in numerous fundraisers and publicity campaigns.

Partial discography

As Kittie “Miss Soul” Doswell
With the  Ray Johnson Combo:
Soul So-01 – "Need Your Love So Bad" / "When the Saints Go Marching In" – 1964
Soul Sm-02 – "Hold On" / "I Found Out" – 1964
Soul So-02 – "Broken Pieces Of My Heart" / "Watch Out" – 1964
Soul So-03 – "The Nearness Of You" / "Ride On Blue Train" – 1964

As Kittie Doswell
Donna Records  1347 (7”)  "Need Your Love So Bad" b/w "Marchin' On" – 1961
Soul So-300 – "Your Old Standby" / "Understanding" – 1964
Mainstream Records MRL 348 (The Night Blooming Jazzmen – The Night Blooming Jazzmen)  – Vocals on "Evil Gal Blues" – 1971
Mainstream Records MSL 1016 (The Night Blooming Jazzmen – Freedom Jazz Dance)  – Vocals on "Counting My Tears" - 1973
H E S Records 2468 – "Just A Face In The Crowd" / "This Could Only Happen To Me" – 1973

References

1939 births
2011 deaths
20th-century African-American women singers
American jazz singers
American women jazz singers
American soul singers
Mainstream Records artists
Musicians from Houston
Jazz musicians from Texas
Deaths from lung cancer
21st-century African-American people
21st-century African-American women